James Carter is a fringe theorist whose theory of "circlons" attempts to replace the existing theories of relativity, quantum mechanics, and the big bang theory with the idea that everything is made up of circular objects that interact in a mechanical way. His ideas are not the subject of serious scientific attention, although he has been studied by writers on fringe science and been the subject of exhibitions in Santa Monica, California and Los Angeles. Writer Margaret Wertheim called him "the Leonardo da Vinci of fringe theorists", and wrote a book about him, Physics on the Fringe. She also produced a documentary about him called It’s Jim’s World - We Just Live In It.

Life
In the 1970s, Carter worked as an abalone diver, and invented Carter Lift Bags, flotation devices to bring sunken objects to the ocean's surface.  He now manufactures and sells these lift bags.  He has also worked as a gold miner, and now owns a trailer park in Enumclaw, Washington.

Theories
According to Carter, the universe is composed of what he calls "circlons", ring-like structures like "atomic LEGO blocks, interlocking rings that snap together to form all the elements". He proposes that instead of the Big Bang theory, the universe began when two circlons combined and mated, subdividing to make up all the matter in the universe. His theory is mechanistic, and does not involve action at a distance. He explains gravity as due to the constant expansion of the universe. He derived his theories from experiments involving smoke rings, which he sees as forming analogies for the workings of circlons. His theories and experiments resemble those of 19th century scientists Lord Kelvin and Peter Guthrie Tait.

Exhibitions
An exhibition about Carter's theories was held at the Santa Monica Museum of Art, in Santa Monica, California in 2002, curated by Margaret Wertheim. The exhibition included video animations, models and diagrams. Another exhibition on his work opened at the Institute For Figuring gallery in Los Angeles in December 2011.

References

External links
The Living Universe

Living people
People from Enumclaw, Washington
Pseudoscientific physicists
Year of birth missing (living people)